Lie Yukou  was a Chinese philosopher who is considered the author of the Daoist book Liezi, which uses his honorific name Liezi.

Name
The second Chinese character in Yukou is written kou  "bandit; enemy"; the first is written yu  "imprison", yu  "resist; ward off", or occasionally yu  "drive (carriage); ride (horse); control" (the Zhuangzi claims Liezi could yufeng  "ride the wind").

Early life
Lie Yukou was born in the State of Zheng, near today's Zhengzhou, Henan Province.

History
There is little historical evidence of Lie Yukou as a Hundred Schools of Thought philosopher during the Warring States period. This could be due to the burning of books and burying of scholars which occurred during the reign of Qin Shi Huang. However, some scholars believe that the Zhuangzi invented him as a Daoist exemplar.  Frederic H. Balfour, who translated several Taoist texts, called Liezi "a philosopher who never lived" (1887:?) Lionel Giles expresses doubt in his Introduction: Very little is known of our author beyond what he tells us himself. His full name was Lieh Yü-k'ou, and it appears that he was living in the Chêng State not long before the year 398 BC, when the Prime Minister Tzu Yang was killed in a revolution. He figures prominently in the pages of Chuang Tzu, from whom we learn that he could 'ride upon the wind'. On the insufficient ground that he is not mentioned by the historian Ssu-ma Ch'ien, a certain critic of the Sung dynasty was led to declare that Lieh Tzu was only a fictitious personage invented by Chuang Tzu, and that the treatise which passes under his name was a forgery of later times. This theory is rejected by the compilers of the great Catalogue of Ch‘ien Lung's Library, who represent the cream of Chinese scholarship in the eighteenth century.

In the above quote Mr. Lionel Giles may have been refuting his father Herbert Allen Giles, who wrote of Lie Yukou or Lieh-Tzu in his translation of Chuang Tzu. Here is his quote which runs as follows: The extent of the actual mischief done by this " Burning of the Books " has been greatly exaggerated. Still, the mere attempt at such a holocaust gave a fine chance to the scholars of the later Han dynasty (A.D. 25-221), who seem to have enjoyed nothing so much as forging, if not the whole, at any rate portions, of the works of ancient authors. Some one even produced a treatise under the name of Lieh Tzu, a philosopher mentioned by Chuang Tzu, not seeing that the individual in question was a creation of Chuang Tzu's brain!

References

Further reading
Balfour, Frederic H. Leaves from my Chinese Scrapbook. London: Trubner. 1887. Reprint. 2001.
Giles, Lionel, tr. Taoist Teachings from the Book of Lieh-Tzŭ. London: Wisdom of the East. 1912.
Giles, Herbert A., tr. Chuang Tzu: Mystic, Moralist and Social Reformer. London: Bernard Quaritch 1889.

External links
 Lieh-tzu: A Biographical Note, Taoism Initiation Page
 Taoist teachings from the book of Lieh Tzŭ, Giles' translation at Wikisource
 
 
 
 

4th-century BC Chinese philosophers
Taoist immortals
Zhou dynasty philosophers
Zhou dynasty Taoists